Daylight is an album by American keyboardist and composer Wayne Horvitz' band Pigpen recorded in 1997 and released on the independent Tim/Kerr label.

Reception
The Allmusic review by Jason Ankeny awarded the album 4 stars calling it "A chaotic, pulsing record".

Track listing
All compositions by Wayne Horvitz except as indicated
 "Daylight" - 4:24   
 "V as in Victim" - 6:38   
 "Oh Blue Angels, You Are But a God To Me" - 4:39   
 "Don't Explode On Me" - 1:57   
 "Trouble" - 1:56   
 "Arrive" - 4:58   
 "Mr. Rogers" - 3:55   
 "Tap" - 4:59   
 "Mel" (Fred Chalenor) - 2:40   
 "Duet" - 3:31   
 "The Gift" - 3:46   
 "Trio" - 2:50

Personnel
Wayne Horvitz - piano, organ, electronics
Briggan Krauss - alto saxophone
Fred Chalenor - electric bass
Mike Stone - drums, percussion

References

Tim/Kerr Records albums
Wayne Horvitz albums
1997 albums